The Vermont Catamounts men's ice hockey team is a National Collegiate Athletic Association (NCAA) Division I college ice hockey program that represents the University of Vermont. The Catamounts are a member of Hockey East, joining in 2005 after competing in ECAC Hockey from 1974 to 2005. They play home games at Gutterson Fieldhouse in Burlington, Vermont. Vermont has appeared in the NCAA Men's Hockey Championship six times since making the move to Division I in 1974–75, including trips to the Frozen Four in 1996 and 2009.

Prior to moving to Division I, UVM competed in ECAC Division II, where it won back-to-back ECAC Division II titles in 1972-73 and 1973–74.

Since 1990, the Catamounts have hosted what is now known as the Catamount Cup tournament, winning the title seven times.

Alumni
The University of Vermont has produced 18 National Hockey League (NHL) players in its history. Alumni currently in the NHL include Ross Colton '18 (Tampa Bay Lightning) and Connor Brickley '14 (New York Rangers). Colton, Patrick Sharp '02, Viktor Stålberg '09, Éric Perrin '97, and former NHL All-Stars Martin St. Louis '97, Tim Thomas '97 and John LeClair '91 have won the Stanley Cup in their careers.

In 2004, St. Louis was awarded the Hart Memorial Trophy as the NHL's most valuable player, the Art Ross Trophy as the NHL's leading scorer, the Lester B. Pearson Award as the league's most outstanding player in the regular season as judged by the members of the NHL Players Association, and the Bud Light Plus/Minus award. Thomas has won the Vezina Trophy twice as the NHL's top goaltender in 2009 and 2011, and the Conn Smythe Trophy as the most valuable player of the Stanley Cup playoffs in 2011. He also holds the NHL record for best single season save percentage. UVM is the only NCAA program in history to count alumni who have won both the Hart Trophy and the Vezina Trophy, as well as the only NCAA program to generate an Art Ross winner.

A two-time Olympian in 1998 and 2002, LeClair was elected to the United States Hockey Hall of Fame in 2009 after a standout 16-year NHL career where he scored 406 goals. He was a two-time NHL first team All-Star and twice won the Bud Light Plus/Minus Award.  LeClair is the only American born player to record three consecutive 50 goal seasons, and is the only NHL player with back to back game winning SCF OT goals.

Other Catamounts who were U.S. Olympians were Thomas (2010), former NHL defenseman Aaron Miller (2002, 2006) and Ryan Gunderson (2018). St. Louis skated for Canada in the 2006 and 2014 Olympics, while Sharp was named to Canada's 2014 Olympic squad. Viktor Stalberg also represented Sweden at the 2018 Olympics. Vermont was one of just five college hockey programs to have at least one alumnus participating in every Olympic games since NHL players began competing in 1998 until 2018 when NHL players did not compete in Olympic competition.

Season-by-season results

Source:

Head coaches
As of the completion of 2021–22 season

All-time scoring leaders
Source:

Career goals leaders

Single-season goals record:
Tim O'Connell, 41 goals in 1974-75

Career assists leaders

Single-season assists record:
Martin St. Louis/Éric Perrin, 56 assists in 1995-96

Career points leaders

Single-season points record:
Martin St. Louis/Éric Perrin, 85 points in 1995-96

Goaltending leaders
Career save percentage leaders (min. 40 games):

Single-season save record:
Tim Thomas, 1,079 in 1996-97

Current roster
As of September 12, 2022.

|}

Awards and honors

Hockey Hall of Fame
Source:

Martin St. Louis (2018)

United States Hockey Hall of Fame
Source:

John LeClair (2009)

NCAA

Individual awards

NCAA Scoring Champion
Martin St. Louis: 1996
Éric Perrin: 1996

All-American teams
AHCA College Division All-Americans

1968–69: George Kreiner, D
1969–70: Dave Reece, G; George Kreiner, D
1970–71: Dave Reece, G; Ted Yeates, D
1971–72: Ted Yeates, D; Pat Wright, F
1972–73: Brad Cooke, D; Pat Wright, F
1973–74: John Murphy, D; Ted Castle, F; Willie MacKinnon, F

AHCA First Team All-Americans

1974–75: Tim O'Connell, F
1978–79: Louis Cote, D
1979–80: Louis Cote, D; Craig Homola, F
1981–82: Kirk McCaskill, F
1988–89: Kyle McDonough, F
1994–95: Martin St. Louis, F
1995–96: Tim Thomas, G; Éric Perrin, F; Martin St. Louis, F
1996–97: Martin St. Louis, F
2008–09: Viktor Stålberg, F

AHCA Second Team All-Americans

1983–84: Kevin Foster, F
1991–92: Christian Soucy, G
1992–93: Aaron Miller, D
1994–95: Tim Thomas, G
2014–15: Mike Paliotta, D

ECAC Hockey

Individual awards

Player of the Year
Craig Homola: 1980
Martin St. Louis: 1995
Éric Perrin: 1996

Best Defensive Defenseman
Jaime Sifers: 2005

Rookie of the Year
Christian Soucy: 1992
Éric Perrin: 1994
Joe Fallon: 2005

Ken Dryden Award
Tim Thomas: 1996

Tim Taylor Award
Mike Gilligan: 1988

All-Conference teams
First Team All-ECAC Hockey

1974–75: Tim O'Connell, F
1978–79: Louis Cote, D
1979–80: Louis Cote, D; Craig Homola, F
1981–82: Kirk McCaskill, F
1983–84: Kevin Foster, F
1985–86: Tom Draper, G
1988–89: Kyle McDonough, F
1991–92: Christian Soucy, G
1992–93: Aaron Miller, D
1994–95: Tim Thomas, G; Éric Perrin, F; Martin St. Louis, F
1995–96: Tim Thomas, G; Éric Perrin, F; Martin St. Louis, F
1996–97: Martin St. Louis, F
2003–04: Brady Leisenring, F

Second Team All-ECAC Hockey

1974–75: Tom McNamara, G; John Glynne, D
1979–80: Sylvain Turcotte, G
1987–88: Ian Boyce, F; Kyle McDonough, F
1990–91: John LeClair, F
1992–93: Christian Soucy, G
1996–97: Éric Perrin, F
1998–99: Jason Reid, F
2004–05: Jaime Sifers, D; Scott Misfud, F

ECAC Hockey All-Rookie Team

1987–88: Stephane Venne, D; John LeClair, F
1988–89: Jim Larkin, F
1989–90: Aaron Miller, D
1991–92: Christian Soucy, G; Dominique Ducharme, F
1992–93: Matt Johnson, F
1993–94: Tim Thomas, G; Éric Perrin, F; Martin St. Louis, F
1995–96: Jan Kloboucek, F
1997–98: Andrew Allen, G; Andreas Moborg, D
2000–01: Patrick Sharp, F
2002–03: Jaime Sifers, D
2004–05: Joe Fallon, G; Torrey Mitchell, F

Hockey East

Individual awards

Rookie of the Year
Mario Puskarich: 2014

Best Defensive Defenseman
Mike Paliotta: 2015

Len Ceglarski Award
Dean Strong: 2009
Chris McCarthy: 2013

Coach of the Year
Kevin Sneddon: 2008

All-Conference teams
First Team All-Hockey East

2008–09: Viktor Stålberg, F

Second Team All-Hockey East

2013–14: Chris McCarthy, F
2014–15: Mike Paliotta, D
2018–19: Stefanos Lekkas, G

Third Team All-Hockey East

Hockey East All-Rookie Team

2006–07: Brayden Irwin, F
2009–10: Sebastian Stalberg, F
2011–12: Kyle Reynolds, F
2013–14: Mario Puskarich, F
2016–17: Ross Colton, F

Olympians
This is a list of Vermont alumni who have played on an Olympic team.

Vermont Athletic Hall of Fame
The following is a list of people associated with the Vermont men's ice hockey program who were elected into the Vermont Athletic Hall of Fame (induction date in parenthesis).

Ian Boyce (1999)
Ted Castle (1985)
Ted Child (1985)
George "Red" Cook (1970)
Louis Cote (1990)
Thomas Cullity (1990)
William Dempsey (1984)
Tom Draper (1997)
Stephen Eckerson (1988)
Joe Fallon (2018)
Kevin Foster (1998)
Mike Gilligan (2019)
Richard Healy (1993)
Craig Homola (1991)
John Hurley (1981)
John Kiely (1991)
Randall Koch (1989)
William Koch III (1993)
George Kreiner (1980)
John LeClair (2001)
Willie MacKinnon (1984)
Roger Mallette (1985)
Kirk McCaskill (1993)
Kyle McDonough (1999)
Aaron Miller (2003)
George Minarsky (1984)
Torrey Mitchell (2019)
John Murphy (1999)
Tim O'Connell (1986)
Éric Perrin (2007)
Gary Prior (1995)
Dave Reece (1981)
Lee J. Roy (1990)
Robert Schroeder (1991)
Jack Semler (1982)
Jaime Sifers (2016)
Martin St. Louis (2007)
Dean Strong (2019)
Tim Thomas (2007)
Sylvain Turcotte (1997)
Chip Uihlein (1989)
Francis Winchenbach (1973)
Pat Wright (1983)
Jim Yeats (1998)
Ted Yeates (1982)

Catamounts in the NHL
As of July 1, 2022

Source:

Media
All games are broadcast on WVMT; Alastair Ingram provides play-by-play.

See also
 Vermont Catamounts women's ice hockey

References

External links
 

 
Ice hockey teams in Vermont